Zoltán Fülöp (born 26 July 1976 in Csorvás) is a Hungarian retired football (forward) player.

References
HLSZ 

1976 births
Living people
People from Csorvás
Sportspeople from Békés County
Hungarian footballers
Association football forwards
Békéscsaba 1912 Előre footballers
Ferencvárosi TC footballers
Nyíregyháza Spartacus FC players
BFC Siófok players
SV Mattersburg players
FC Sopron players
Hapoel Nof HaGalil F.C. players
Hapoel Ashkelon F.C. players
Liga Leumit players
SKU Amstetten players
Hungarian expatriate footballers
Expatriate footballers in Austria
Expatriate footballers in Israel
Hungarian expatriate sportspeople in Austria
Hungarian expatriate sportspeople in Israel